Corazón de Jesús Airport  is an airstrip serving Corazón de Jesús and Narganá, island towns in the Guna Yala comarca (indigenous province) of Panama.

Approach and departure to either runway end are over the water.

Air Panama serves the airstrip.

Airlines and destinations

See also
Transport in Panama
List of airports in Panama

References

External links
 OpenStreetMap - Corazón de Jesús Airport
 OurAirports - Corazón de Jesús Airport
 
 Google Earth

Airports in Panama
Guna Yala